Ksenia Aleksandrovna Evgenova (born 19 April 1996) is a Russian badminton player. In the national event, she plays for the Sdyusshor, and in 2017, she was the semi finalist at the National Championships in the women's doubles event partnered with Maria Shegurova.

Achievements

BWF International Challenge/Series 
Women's doubles

Mixed doubles

  BWF International Challenge tournament
  BWF International Series tournament
  BWF Future Series tournament

References

External links 
 

1996 births
Living people
People from Zhukovsky, Moscow Oblast
Russian female badminton players
Sportspeople from Moscow Oblast
20th-century Russian women
21st-century Russian women